This is a list of universities in Niue.

Universities
 Lord Liverpool University - Niue campus
 Royal Academy of Fine Arts (Det Jyske Kunstakademi)
 St. Clements University Higher Education School
 University of the South Pacific - Niue campus

See also 
 List of universities by country

References

Universities
Niue
Niue

Universities